Sara Sport Football Club is a Togolese football club based in Bafilo. They play in the second division in Togolese football.

Stadium
Currently the team plays at the 1000 capacity Stade Municipal Bafilo.

League participations
Togolese Championnat National:2011–2012
Togolese Second Division:2012–

Performance in CAF competitions
CAF Cup: 1 appearance
2002 –

Performance in Coupe du Togo
Final 2001:Dynamic Togolais (Lomé) 3–0 Sara Sport de Bafilo

References

External links
Soccerway

Football clubs in Togo